Extra (originally Brisbane Extra) was a nightly tabloid local current affairs program, broadcast on Nine Network Queensland. Heather Foord was the last host of the program. A weekend version also aired on a Saturday afternoon named Weekend Extra hosted by Melissa Downes.

Hosts
 Rick Burnett (1992–2006)
 Jillian Whiting (2006–2008)
 Heather Foord (2009)

Presenter Jillian Whiting returned from maternity leave. However, during her time away, various television, radio, and media celebrities from around Queensland and Australia had been asked to step into the hosting role for a week each. After this trial was finished, both Melissa Downes and Miranda Deakin, presented the remaining few weeks and over the summer break. The official word from the Nine Network was that Jillian Whiting would return to Extra and her former role as presenter of the Gold Coast's National Nine News, from the very first program in 2008, however this was delayed by two weeks.

Reporters
 Doug Murray
 Margueritte Rossi
 Nicole Madigan
 Rory O'Connor
 Jasmin Geisel (now FORSYTH)
 Belinda Burrows
 Lisa Honeywill
 Natalie Gruzlewski
 Sylvia Jeffreys
 Dana Sanders
 Ben McCormack
 Shane Doherty

History
On 10 February 1992, Brisbane Extra launched alongside other sister productions in capital cities around the country. A Current Affair reporter, Rick Burnett, made his debut as host, with ex-ABC personality Doug Murray and a team of young reporters. One year later, the sister programs were axed, but the Brisbane program proved so popular with its local audience, it continued, changing its name to simply Extra.

In 2000, Extra celebrated its 2000th episode with a free family fun day at South Bank including a special performance by Hi-5. And celebrated its 3000th episode in 2004 by giving viewers 3000 presents every day for a week.

In 2006, Rick Burnett was sacked by the network and replaced by newsreader and journalist Jillian Whiting. The program was briefly aired in regional Queensland via WIN Television in 2007, but was dropped six months later. Jillian continued to host Extra until 2008, when she moved to the Seven Network. Heather Foord became host in 2009 after she stood down as newsreader on Nine News.

Cancellation

Despite its eighteen long years of popularity and ratings success, the local current affairs program was axed by the Nine Network on 17 June 2009, due to a major schedule clean up for making space for Nine's new one-hour current affairs program, This Afternoon, hosted by Andrew Daddo, Katrina Blowers and Mark Ferguson from 4:30pm weekdays starting the following Monday after the final ever broadcast. The decision was a part of a push to nationalise lead-in content for the network's struggling news bulletins. The game show Millionaire Hot Seat was moved to replace Extra at 5.30pm.

The fate of the show's presenter Heather Foord was initially unclear, however, it was later announced by the network that she would rejoin Nine News as weekend news presenter.

The final broadcast ended with a final goodbye on 26 June with a message from Heather Foord thanking all the viewers for their support, with the emails, phone calls and faxes with in protest over the decision to cancel Extra - The broadcast closed with a montage of memories over the program's 18-year-run.

Extra's local website was removed one week following the final episode.

The Extra brand was later used on a television channel launched 3 years after this program's discontinuation, on March 26 2012 on LCN 94 (now on LCN 97).

See also
 List of Australian television series
 List of Nine Network programs
 List of longest-running Australian television series

References

Nine Network original programming
Television shows set in Brisbane
Australian television news shows
1991 Australian television series debuts
2009 Australian television series endings